Tutupaca is a mountain in the Andes of southern Peru, about  high. It is located in the Moquegua Region, Mariscal Nieto Province, Torata District, and in the Tacna Region, Candarave Province, Camilaca District. Tutupaca is situated southeast of the mountains Limani and  Apachita Limani, west of Tutupaca volcano, north of Chuqi Ananta and Wañuma, and northeast of Pumani. The Asana River originates near Tutupaca and it flows to the southwest.

References

Mountains of Moquegua Region
Mountains of Tacna Region
Mountains of Peru